Old Cwmbrân (also known as Cwmbrân Village) is an area of Cwmbrân, Torfaen in Wales, within the historic boundaries of Monmouthshire.

Original village
Old Cwmbrân was the village which gave the 1950s New Town of Cwmbrân its name, the New Town being an amalgamation of the villages of Pontnewydd, Llanyrafon, Croesyceiliog and (Old) Cwmbrân.

Village amenities
Despite being part of the much larger Cwmbrân conurbation, Old Cwmbrân retains many of the amenities of an independent village. The main high street has numerous shops and public houses. The area boasts a large Anglican church and a Roman Catholic church as well as a health centre and small supermarket known as WHAT! Old Cwmbrân has become the home of Torfaen's first licensed sexshop.

Geographically, Old Cwmbrân all but merged with adjacent Southville, Llantarnam and Cwmbran Centre. The shopping centre five minutes walk from the central village area.

References

Villages in Torfaen
Cwmbran